Trinidad State Beach is a state beach  north of Eureka in Humboldt County, California. The offshore rocks are part of the California Coastal National Monument. Colorful tide pools provide specimens to Humboldt State University's Fred Telonicher Marine Laboratory located in Trinidad. 

Nearby parks include Little River State Beach just south of Trinidad and to the north, Sue-meg State Park. The Beach's latitude and longitude are 41.0594 / -124.1420.

Access
This park is accessed from a signposted side road at Trinity Street and Stagecoach Road in the seaside town of Trinidad. The parking lot at Trinidad Bay below Trinidad Head is another popular access point.

See also
List of beaches in California
List of California state parks

References

External links

 Archived by WebCite at https://www.webcitation.org/5bxpohNWL)
Trinidad State Beach - HCCVB

Image of the State Beach

California State Reserves
California State Beaches
State parks of California
Parks in Humboldt County, California
Beaches of Humboldt County, California
Beaches of Northern California